Dan Spring (1 July 1910 – 1 January 1988) was an Irish Labour Party politician who served as a Teachta Dála (TD) for the Kerry North constituency from 1943 to 1981. He was a Parliamentary Secretary to the Minister for Local Government from 1956 to 1957. He was the father of Dick Spring, who led the Labour Party from 1982 to 1997.

Early life 
Spring was born into a working-class family in Tralee, County Kerry. He left school at the age of 14 and began his working life with a series of low-skilled jobs. When he was working at a mill, he became involved in the Irish Transport and General Workers' Union (ITGWU) and after a while became a trade union official. He married Anna Laide (1919–1997) in 1943. Spring was a Gaelic football player, and was the captain of the Tralee Kerins O'Rahilly's team with whom he won two Kerry Senior Football Championship titles. He first played with Kerry when he won Munster and All-Ireland Junior titles in 1930, and captain of the Kerry county side when they won the All-Ireland final in 1940.

Politics 
Through his involvement with the ITGWU he became well-known enough to stand in Kerry North for the Labour Party at the 1943 general election. He was elected as the first Labour Party Teachta Dála (TD) for Kerry and held his seat until he retired in 1981.

In 1944, Spring was among a group of six TDs who broke away from the Labour Party because it was allegedly infiltrated by communists and formed a new party they called the National Labour Party. The Labour Party and the National Labour Party reunited in 1950, having worked alongside each other in the First Inter-Party Government since 1948.

In 1956, during the term of the Second Inter-Party Government Spring was appointed as Parliamentary Secretary to the Minister for Local Government, which he held until the government ended in 1957.

For the rest of his political career Spring never held any significant post on a national level, and as a relatively conservative rural Labour man he fell out of step with the official line of the Labour Party, which moved significantly to the left during the 1960s and 1970s. During a vote on contraception, Spring famously said that on the day of the vote, his constituents would see how he stood on the issue. On the day of the vote, he appeared as a barrister in a court far away from the parliament. Spring concentrated on his constituency work and was returned in every election he stood in until he retired in 1981, his son Dick then successfully contesting the seat.

See also
Families in the Oireachtas

References

 

1910 births
1988 deaths
All-Ireland-winning captains (football)
Irish sportsperson-politicians
Kerry inter-county Gaelic footballers
Kerins O'Rahilly's Gaelic footballers
Labour Party (Ireland) TDs
Members of the 11th Dáil
Members of the 12th Dáil
Members of the 13th Dáil
Members of the 14th Dáil
Members of the 15th Dáil
Members of the 16th Dáil
Members of the 17th Dáil
Members of the 18th Dáil
Members of the 19th Dáil
Members of the 20th Dáil
Members of the 21st Dáil
National Labour Party (Ireland) TDs
Parliamentary Secretaries of the 15th Dáil
People from Tralee
Politicians from County Kerry